Deepak Sharma (born 1 May 1984) is an Indian former cricketer. He played nine first-class matches for Assam between 2008 and 2010.

References

External links
 

1984 births
Living people
Indian cricketers
Assam cricketers
Cricketers from Delhi